The Zambia Open is a men's professional golf tournament played in Zambia, that has been part of the Sunshine Tour since 1996, and was co-sanctioned by the European-based Challenge Tour from 2001 to 2004. It was also an event on the Challenge Tour between 1991 and 1993, having previously part of the now defunct Safari Circuit.

History
Lusaka Golf Club has traditionally hosted the Zambia Open, but in 2005 a disagreement with the then sponsors, Stanbic, resulted in the cancellation of the tournament, with a new venue being found for the following year. Under a new sponsorship agreement, the 2008 tournament was held at Chainama Hills Golf Club for the first time, with a prize fund of 750,000 rand. From 2006 to 2010, it was contested as a 54-hole tournament. In 2011, it returned to being played over four rounds, 72 holes.

Former winners include 1991 Masters Tournament champion Ian Woosnam and fellow European Ryder Cup players Christy O'Connor Jnr, Sam Torrance, Gordon J. Brand, Tommy Horton and Brian Barnes.

Winners

Notes

References

External links
Coverage on the Sunshine Tour's official site
Coverage on the Challenge Tour's official site

Safari Circuit events
Former Sunshine Tour events
Former Challenge Tour events
Golf tournaments in Zambia
Recurring sporting events established in 1972
1972 establishments in Zambia
Winter events in Zambia